Nury Montsé (December 25, 1917 – December 26, 1971) was a Spanish-Argentine film actress of the 1930s and 1940s.
 
She made over 20 appearances in Argentine cinema from 1936 to 1946.

Career

Filmography

 Compañeros (1936)
 Don Quijote del altillo (as Urbana) (1936)
 Papá Chirola (1937)
 Campeón por una mujer (1939)
 Chimbela (1939)
 Palabra de honor (1939)
 Twelve Women (1939)
 Chingolo (1940)
 Con el dedo en el gatillo (1940)
 Dama de compañía (1940)Educating Niní (1940)
 La casa del recuerdo (1940)
 Canción de cuna (Cradle Song) (1941)
 El mejor papá del mundo (The Best Father in the World) (1941)
 Los martes, orquídeas (On Tuesdays, Orchids) (1941)
 El gran secreto (1942)
 Historia de crímenes (Tale of Crimes, as Esther) (1942)
 El viejo Hucha (The Old Skinflint) (1942)
 Mi novia es un fantasma (1944)
 Seven Women (1944)
 Su esposa diurna (1944)
 El hombre que se llevaron'' (as Nury Montsé) (1946)

External links
 

Argentine film actresses
Spanish emigrants to Argentina
1917 births
1971 deaths
20th-century Argentine actresses

People from Catalonia